Kirill Yuryevich Glushchenkov (born 5 February 2000) is a Russian football player who plays for Torpedo-BelAZ Zhodino.

Club career
He made his debut in the Russian Football National League for FC Fakel Voronezh on 1 August 2020 in a game against FC Akron Tolyatti, he substituted Andrey Nikitin in the 85th minute.

References

External links
 
 Profile by Russian Football National League
 

2000 births
Sportspeople from Stavropol
Living people
Russian footballers
Association football midfielders
Russian expatriate footballers
Expatriate footballers in Belarus
FC Dynamo Moscow reserves players
FC Fakel Voronezh players
FC Isloch Minsk Raion players
FC Torpedo-BelAZ Zhodino players